Memorial Building, also known as G.A.R. Memorial Hall, is a historic Grand Army of the Republic hall located in Topeka, Kansas, United States. On July 17, 1975, the building was added to the National Register of Historic Places.

History
The construction of Memorial Hall was financed by war claims paid to the State of Kansas by the federal government; one for $97,466.02 for equipping and putting soldiers in the field during the American Civil War, and the other for $425,065.43 for repelling invasions of Confederate soldiers and dealing with American Indian Wars.

In 1909, a legislative money appropriation act was passed. A commission selected the site, acquired the land title, and supervised construction of Memorial Hall. On September 27, 1911, President William Howard Taft laid the ceremonial cornerstone. The building was completed in 1914 and dedicated before 25,000 people on May 27 of that same year.

Since 2000, Memorial Hall has served as headquarters for the Kansas Attorney General and Kansas Secretary of State.

See also
 Kansas Historical Society
 Kansas in the American Civil War
 Sons of Union Veterans of the Civil War

References

External links
 Office of the Kansas Attorney General
 Office of the Kansas Secretary of State
 Kansas Historical Society
 Grand Army of the Republic, Department of Kansas - Manuscript Collection
 National Register of Historic Places - Nomination Form

Buildings and structures completed in 1914
Buildings and structures in Topeka, Kansas
Clubhouses on the National Register of Historic Places in Kansas
Kansas
Kansas Attorneys General
Monuments and memorials in Kansas
Renaissance Revival architecture in Kansas
Secretaries of State of Kansas
National Register of Historic Places in Topeka, Kansas
1914 establishments in Kansas